Dikarevo is a rural locality (a village) in Komyanskoye Rural Settlement, Gryazovetsky District, Vologda Oblast, Russia. The population was 15 as of 2002.

Geography 
Dikarevo is located 33 km northeast of Gryazovets (the district's administrative centre) by road. Sychevo is the nearest rural locality.

References 

Rural localities in Gryazovetsky District